Streptomyces kunmingensis is a bacterium species from the genus of Streptomyces which has been isolated from soil from the Dagyanlow's Lake in Kunming in China.

See also 
 List of Streptomyces species

References

Further reading

External links
Type strain of Streptomyces kunmingensis at BacDive -  the Bacterial Diversity Metadatabase	

kunmingensis
Bacteria described in 1986